Sir Henry Hoyle Howorth  (1 July 1842 – 15 July 1923) was a British Conservative politician, barrister and amateur historian and geologist.

Career

He was born in Lisbon, Portugal, the son of Henry Howorth, a merchant in that city. He was educated at Rossall School before studying law. He was called to the bar by the Inner Temple in 1867, and practised on the Northern Circuit. He was also the maternal great uncle of anthropologist Sir Edmund Ronald Leach.

He was a Unionist in politics, and was elected as Conservative Member of Parliament for Salford South in 1886. He was re-elected in 1892 and 1895 before retiring from the Commons at the 1900 general election.

Apart from the law and politics, Howorth was deeply interested in archaeology, history, numismatics and ethnography. He was a prolific writer, contributing articles to a number of journals.

In 1892 he was appointed a Knight Commander of the Indian Empire in recognition of his works on the history and ethnography of Asia. In 1893 he was made a Fellow of the Royal Society, against considerable opposition as he lacked any formal scientific education. He subsequently became Honorary Librarian of Chetham's College, Manchester, and a Trustee of the British Museum. He was also a Member of the Chetham Society, serving as a Member of Council from 1877 until 1900. He was also a Member of the Manchester Literary and Philosophical Society and a Freemason.

Howorth was a controversialist, frequently airing his opinions on the letters page of The Times, sometimes under the pseudonym "A Manchester Conservative". He married Katherine Brierley in 1869 and they had three sons, one of whom was Sir Rupert Howorth. His wife predeceased him in 1921. Sir Henry Howorth died in July 1923 aged 81, and was buried in Putney Vale Cemetery.

Catastrophism

Howorth rejected the uniformitarianism of James Hutton and Charles Lyell. He attacked the ice age theory in his book The Mammoth and the Flood (1887). He defended a form of neo-diluvialism, that catastrophic floods had devastated large areas of the earth.

He did not believe in a global flood and considered the biblical deluge just one of many flood myths to support his theory. He used geological evidence to support his theory in The Glacial Nightmare and the Flood (1893). In 1905, he wrote another book Ice or Water that attempted to refute the glacial theory in detail. Professional geologists were not convinced by his theory.

Works
The books and journals he authored summarise his vast areas of interest:

On Mongolia:
 H.H. Howorth (霍渥斯), History of the Mongols (in three-volumes, 1876–88):
 
 History of the Mongols: The Mongols proper and the Kalmuks: Part I 
 History of the Mongols, from the 9th to the 19th Century: Part I
 
 H.H. Howorth, History of Chinghis Khan and his Ancestors.
 H.H. Howorth, "The Spread of the Slaves, Part III: The Northern Serbs or Sorabians and the Obodoiti", The Journal of the Anthropological Institute of Great Britain and Ireland, 9 (1880), pp. 181–232.

On the English Church:
 H.H. Howorth, The History of the Church in England to the Eighth Century (in three volumes, 1912–17): 
 Saint Gregory the Great (1912);
 Saint Augustine of Canterbury (1913); and
 The Golden Days of the Early English Church (1917).

In his geological works, he attacked the theories of Charles Lyell, discounting the existence of Ice Ages in favour of great floods:
 H.H. Howorth, The Mammoth and the Flood (1887);
 H.H. Howorth, The Glacial Nightmare (1893); and
 H.H. Howorth, Ice or Water? (1905).

References

External links
 
 Chetham Society

1842 births
1923 deaths
Catastrophism
Conservative Party (UK) MPs for English constituencies
Fellows of the Royal Society
Knights Commander of the Order of the Indian Empire
Presidents of the Royal Numismatic Society
Members of the Inner Temple
People educated at Rossall School
UK MPs 1886–1892
UK MPs 1892–1895
UK MPs 1895–1900
Members of the Parliament of the United Kingdom for Salford South
Manchester Literary and Philosophical Society
Freemasons of the United Grand Lodge of England
Record Society of Lancashire and Cheshire
Lancashire and Cheshire Antiquarian Society
Chetham Society
Presidents of the Royal Archaeological Institute